= Donna Di Grazia =

American musicologist

Donna M. Di Grazia is an American musicologist and choral conductor. She is the David J. Baldwin Professor of Music and Choral Conductor at Pomona College in Claremont, California, and the chair of the college's music department.
